Linda Elisa Neumann (born 17 March 1993) is a German female deaf swimmer. She competed at the Deaflympics in 2009, 2013 and 2017 representing Germany. She currently holds the German deaf swimming record for the women's 400m freestyle event which was set by her in 2014.

Neumann has won 2 medals in her Deaflympic career including a silver medal in the women's 400m freestyle event and a bronze medal in the women's 400m individual medley event as a part of the 2013 Summer Deaflympics.

References 

1993 births
Living people
German female swimmers
Deaf swimmers
German deaf people